The Canadian Women's Amateur is Canada's annual national amateur golf tournament for women. It is open to women from all countries and is played at a different course each year.

History
The first championship was held from October 14 to 17, 1901 at Royal Montreal Golf Club. The 50 or so entries played 18 holes of stroke play on the first afternoon, after which the leading eight ladies played three rounds of 18-hole match play on the following three days. Local member Lily Young had the best score on the first day, 99. Scorers of 107 and better reached the quarter-finals. Consolation events were organised for those not in the leading eight. Young reached the final with two comfortable wins where she met Mabel Thomson, of New Brunswick, who only won her semi-final at the 20th hole. Young won the final 2&1.

Winners

2022 Monet Chun
2021 Lauren Zaretsky
2020 Canceled
2019 Brianna Navarrosa
2018 Yealimi Noh
2017 Jennifer Kupcho
2016 Choi Hye-jin
2015 Mariel Galdiano
2014 Augusta James
2013 Brooke Henderson
2012 Ariya Jutanugarn
2011 Rebecca Lee-Bentham
2010 Sydnee Michaels
2009 Jennifer Kirby
2008 Stacey Keating
2007 Stephanie Sherlock
2006 Jessica Potter
2005 Laura Matthews
2004 Mary Anne Lapointe
2003 Lisa Meldrum
2002 Lisa Meldrum
2001 Lisa Meldrum
2000 Jan Dowling
1999 Mary Anne Lapointe
1998 Kareen Qually
1997 Anna-Jane Eathorne
1996 Mary Anne Lapointe
1995 Tracey Lipp
1994 Aileen Robertson
1993 Mary Anne Lapointe
1992 Marie-Josee Rouleau
1991 Adele Moore
1990 Sarah LeBrun Ingram
1989 Cheryll Damphouse
1988 Michiko Hattori
1987 Tracy Kerdyk
1986 Marilyn Palmer O'Connor
1985 Kimberley Williams
1984 Kimberley Williams
1983 Dawn Coe
1982 Cindy Pleger
1981 Jane Lock
1980 Edwina Kennedy
1979 Stacey West
1978 Cathy Sherk
1977 Cathy Sherk
1976 Debbie Massey
1975 Debbie Massey
1974 Debbie Massey
1973 Marlene Streit
1972 Marlene Streit
1971 Jocelyne Bourassa
1970 Gail Harvey Moore
1969 Marlene Streit
1968 Marlene Streit
1967 Bridget Jackson
1966 Helene Gagnon
1965 Jocelyne Bourassa
1964 Margie Masters
1963 Marlene Streit
1962 Gayle Hitchens
1961 Judy Darling
1960 Judy Darling
1959 Marlene Streit
1958 Marlene Streit
1957 Betty Stanhope
1956 Marlene Stewart
1955 Marlene Stewart
1954 Marlene Stewart
1953 Barbara Romack
1952 Edean Anderson
1951 Marlene Stewart
1950 Dorothy Keilty
1949 Grace DeMoss
1948 Grace Lenczyk
1947 Grace Lenczyk
1939–46 No tournament
1938 Marion Mulqueen
1937 Mrs. John Rogers
1936 Dora Darling
1935 Ada Mackenzie
1934 Alexa Stirling Fraser
1933 Ada Mackenzie
1932 Margery Kirkham
1931 Maureen Orcutt
1930 Maureen Orcutt
1929 Helen Hicks
1928 Virginia Wilson
1927 Helen Payson
1926 Ada Mackenzie
1925 Ada Mackenzie
1924 Glenna Collett
1923 Glenna Collett
1922 Margaret Gavin
1921 Cecil Leitch
1920 Alexa Stirling
1919 Ada Mackenzie
1914–18 No tournament
1913 Muriel Dodd
1912 Dorothy Campbell
1911 Dorothy Campbell
1910 Dorothy Campbell
1909 Violet Henry-Anderson
1908 Mabel Thomson
1907 Mabel Thomson
1906 Mabel Thomson
1905 Mabel Thomson
1904 Florence Harvey
1903 Florence Harvey
1902 Mabel Thomson
1901 Lily Young

Multiple winners
The following women have won the tournament more than once:

11: Marlene Stewart Streit
5: Ada Mackenzie, Mabel Thomson
4: Mary Anne Lapointe
3: Dorothy Campbell, Debbie Massey, Lisa Meldrum
2: Jocelyne Bourassa, Glenna Collett, Judy Darling, Florence Harvey, Grace Lenczyk, Maureen Orcutt, Cathy Sherk, Alexa Stirling Fraser, Kimberley Williams

World Golf Hall of Fame winners
Three championship winners have been inducted into the World Golf Hall of Fame: Dorothy Campbell, Glenna Collett, and Marlene Stewart Streit. All three remained amateurs for their competitive golf careers.

References

External links
Coverage of 2018 event at Golf Canada
Past champions

Women's golf tournaments in Canada
Amateur golf tournaments in Canada